The Somali Olympic Committee is the National Olympic Committee representing Somalia.

Logo

See also
Somalia at the Olympics

References

External links
Somali Olympic Committee (English site)

Somalia
Sports governing bodies in Somalia
Somalia at the Olympics
1959 establishments in Somalia